Blood Mountain  is the highest peak on the Georgia section of the Appalachian Trail and the sixth-tallest mountain in Georgia, with an elevation of . It is located on the border of Lumpkin County with Union County and is within the boundaries of the Chattahoochee National Forest and the Blood Mountain Wilderness. There are several waterfalls, hiking trails and other recreational areas in the vicinity.

Blood Mountain is the high point of the Apalachicola River watershed via the Chattahoochee River.

History

There are various theories on the origin of the mountain's name. Some believe that the name of the mountain comes from a bloody battle between the Cherokee and Muscogee Native Americans. Some people believe that it got its name from the reddish color of the  lichen and Catawba growing near the summit.

Hiking and recreation

This peak has scenic views from the large rock formations that top the mountain. There is a hiker's shelter at the top of the mountain maintained by the Georgia Appalachian Trail Club, and at the bottom of the eastern side of the mountain is a hostel and store (at Neels Gap, where the Appalachian Trail intersects U.S. Highway 19/129) at the Walasi-Yi Interpretive Center. The summit shelter is a two-room stone cabin which was built by the Civilian Conservation Corps in 1934 and was listed on the National Register of Historic Places in January 2013. The Walasi-Yi Center started out as log cabin constructed in the early 20th century by a logging company. It was renovated and expanded by the Civilian Conservation Corps in 1933-38 into a larger stone building. The Center now houses a store; its breezeway is the only place the Appalachian Trail passes through a man-made structure.

There is a short (2 mile) but steep (1,800 foot elevation gain) approach trail to the top of the mountain from a parking area to the immediate north of the Walasi-Yi Center. This hike includes views as walkers approach the summit, and the final , past the Flatrock Gap intersection with the Byron Reece Trail, has a number of switchbacks. It is perhaps the most hiked segment of the Appalachian Trail in Georgia. Another approach is from the other side at Lake Winfield Scott via the Slaughter Creek Trail. This approach, which is easier to hike, has campsites and a number of sources of treatable water.

Adjacent to the mountain are several boulder fields and stands of northern hardwoods and large buckeyes. Portions of the area were previously logged and now sport fast-growing tulip poplar.

Near Blood Mountain are DeSoto Falls Scenic Recreation Area and campground, Vogel State Park and Sosebee Cove Scenic Area. All are accessible from Blood Mountain by trail and road.

References 

Tucker, Margaret. "A Winter Hike on Blood Mountain." Reprinted in Brown's Guide to the Georgia Outdoors, John W. English, ed. Atlanta: 1986, Cherokee Publishing.  
Georgia's Named Summits
100 highest peaks in Georgia
Georgia peaks over

External links 

Blood Mountain Hiking, Backpacking & Camping Guide
TopoQuest map of Blood Mountain
Forest Service information about Blood Mountain
Hiking Trail information to summit of Blood Mountain

Mountains of Lumpkin County, Georgia
Mountains of Georgia (U.S. state)
Mountains on the Appalachian Trail
Mountains of Union County, Georgia
Chattahoochee-Oconee National Forest